Datansha Island is an island at the west of the central district of Guangzhou, Guangdong, China. It has a total area of 4.4 square kilometres.

Administration
The island was administrated by Baiyun District, but it is administered by Liwan District after 2002.

Economy
The island has been an industrial area in the district, but it is being planned to develop to an economic zone of Bai'etan region.

Transportation
There are two metro stations in Datansha, Tanwei Station and Hesha Station.

References

Islands of Guangzhou
Liwan District